Sounds of Summer Tour was the tenth headlining concert tour by American country music artist Dierks Bentley, in support of his seventh studio album Riser (2014). It began on June 6, 2015, in Raleigh, North Carolina and ended in Bonner Springs, Kansas on September 12 of that year. The tour traveled across North America.

Background
On January 12, 2015, the tour was first announced. Tickets first went on sale on January 26, 2015, and the tour is a part of Live Nation's Country Megaticket. Supporting Bentley out on tour are: Kip Moore, Maddie & Tae and Canaan Smith. Bentley said that these three acts "are three of the hottest rising artists out there right now" and he feels "fortunate to be spending the summer with them."

Reception
Ed Masley of The Arizona Republic said of the Phoenix show, "It was an entertaining night that found the singer in excellent voice throughout while leading a stage full of top-notch musicians in a set that struck just the right balance between his upbeat party songs and heartfelt moments that at times recalled the feel of a Bruce Springsteen concert."

Opening acts
Kip Moore
Maddie & Tae
Canaan Smith

Setlist
"Sideways"
"Am I the Only One"
"5-1-5-0"
"Tip It On Back"
"Every Mile a Memory" 
"I Hold On"
"Feel That Fire"
"Sounds of Summer"
"Riser" 
"Lot of Leavin' Left to Do"
B Stage
"Come a Little Closer"
"Back Porch"
"Home"
Main Stage
"Up on the Ridge" 
"Free and Easy (Down the Road I Go)" 
"Say You Do"
Encore
"What Was I Thinkin'"
"Drunk on a Plane"

Tour dates

List of festivals and miscellaneous performances.
 This concert is a part of WYRK's 16th Anniversary Listener Appreciation Concert.
 This concert is a part of WITL's  Taste of Country Music Festival.
 This concert is a part of the Windy City Lakeshake Festival.
 This concert is a part of the Farmborough Festival.
 This Concert is a part of Jamboree in the Hills.
 This concert is a part of the EAA AirVenture Oshkosh 2015.
 This concert is a part of Country Thunder.
 This concert is a part of the Oregon Jamboree.
 This concert is a part of the Rockin' River Music Fest.
 This concert is a part of the Watershed Festival.
 This concert is a part of the WE Fest.
 This concert is a part of Country on the River.
 This concert is a part of the Divots Concert Series.

References

2015 concert tours
Dierks Bentley concert tours